Paraguay competed at the 1976 Summer Olympics in Montreal, Canada. Four competitors, all men, took part in six events in four sports.

Athletics

Men
Track & road events

Fencing

One fencer represented Paraguay in 1976, Bejarano was drawn in Pool nine, and won just one of his five contests.

Shooting

Swimming

Men

See also
Paraguay at the 1975 Pan American Games

References

External links
Official Olympic Reports

Nations at the 1976 Summer Olympics
1976
Olympics